Eugene Kitson (28 November 1889 – 4 August 1962) was an Australian cricketer. He played in one first-class match for South Australia in 1912/13.

See also
 List of South Australian representative cricketers

References

External links
 

1889 births
1962 deaths
Australian cricketers
South Australia cricketers
Cricketers from Adelaide